Kalda is a village in Rapla Parish, Rapla County, Estonia.

Between 1991 and 2017 (until the administrative reform of Estonian municipalities) the village was located in Juuru Parish. Kalda village was detached from Härgla in 2010.

References

Villages in Rapla County